Dmytro Klyachkivsky (also known by his pseudonym Klym Savur; 4 November 1911 – 12 February 1945), also known by his pseudonyms Klym Savur, Okhrim, and Bilash, was a commander of the Ukrainian Insurgent Army (UPA), first head-commander of the UPA-North. He was responsible for the ethnic cleansing of Poles from Volhynia.

Biography
Klyachkivsky was born on 4 November 1911 in the city of Zbarazh, Galicia, Austria-Hungary (now Ukraine) as a son of a bank clerk. He completed his secondary studies and entered the Law faculty of the Jan Kazimierz University in Lwow. A member of the Organization of Ukrainian Nationalists (OUN), he served in the Polish army and worked in the service sector in Stanisławów from 1934 until 1939 as chair of a committee of the Ukrainian sport organization Sokil in Zbarazh.

After the joint Nazi and Soviet attack on Poland, Eastern Poland was occupied by the Soviet Union (see Territories of Poland annexed by the Soviet Union). Klyachkivsky was arrested by the Soviets (NKVD) in Lviv and sentenced to death, which was commuted to 10 years of incarceration. He escaped from Berdychiv Prison in July 1941.

He was a member of the Directorate of the OUN in Lviv, the regional leader of OUN from January 1942, a member of the leadership of OUN and the first commander of the Ukrainian Insurgent Army from 1943. He was given the rank of major and made the regional commander of UIA-North in 1944.

Massacres of Poles in Volhynia
Dmytro Klyachkivsky is regarded as the initiator of the massacres of Poles in Volhynia in modern-day western Ukraine in the years 1943–1945. It was his directive, issued in mid-1943, that ordered the extermination of the Polish population across the province. One Ukrainian Insurgent Army commander who opposed it was threatened by Klyachkivsky with court-martial.

Evidence of his actions was found in SBU archives by Polish historian Władysław Filar and was published in 2000 in his book Before action Wisla, there was Volhynia. It was an order addressed to the commanders of the Ukrainian Insurgent Army in Volhynia. This secret directive stated:

Nevertheless, as noted by Timothy Snyder, among the tens of thousands of Poles murdered by UPA on his orders, most of the victims were women and children.

Death
Klyachkivsky died in an ambush by the forces of the NKVD in February 1945 near the settlement of Orzhiv in the vicinity of Rivne. He was posthumously awarded the title of Colonel of the UIA and UIA Gold Cross of Military Honors First Grade.

See also
 Roman Shukhevych, general of the Ukrainian Insurgent Army

References

External links

  How many soldiers were in Ukrainian Insurgent Army? Historishna Pravda (3 December 2010)

1911 births
1945 deaths
People from Zbarazh
People from the Kingdom of Galicia and Lodomeria
Ukrainian Austro-Hungarians
Commanders of the Ukrainian Insurgent Army
Ukrainian anti-communists
Ukrainian collaborators with Nazi Germany
Ukrainian people of World War II
Ukrainian military leaders
Organization of Ukrainian Nationalists
Massacres of Poles in Volhynia
Holocaust perpetrators in Poland
Ukrainian prisoners sentenced to death
Prisoners sentenced to death by the Soviet Union
Escapees from Soviet detention
Military personnel killed in World War II
Ukrainian military personnel killed in action
People killed in NKVD operations